Vara Parish was a rural municipality in Tartu County, Estonia.

Settlements
Villages
Alajõe - Ätte - Kargaja - Kauda - Keressaare - Koosa - Koosalaane - Kusma - Kuusiku - Matjama - Meoma - Metsakivi - Mustametsa - Papiaru - Pilpaküla - Põdra - Põldmaa - Põrgu - Praaga - Rehemetsa - Särgla - Selgise - Sookalduse - Tähemaa - Undi - Välgi - Vanaussaia - Vara

References

External links